SZ Piscium is a suspected triple star system in the equatorial constellation of Pisces. The inner pair form a double-lined spectroscopic binary with an orbital period of 3.966 days. It is a detached Algol-type eclipsing binary of the RS Canum Venaticorum class with a subgiant component. (This means the pair have a close but separated orbit with the stars eclipsing one another, and the primary component is an evolving star showing star spots and other magnetic activity.) The system is too faint to be readily visible to the naked eye with a combined apparent visual magnitude of 7.18. It is located at a distance of approximately 306 light years based on parallax measurements.

The variability of this star was reported by A. Jensch in 1934, who published the first elements. In 1956 the spectrum of the system was examined by N. G. Roman, who found the cooler component is the brighter and more evolved. The system was studied by G. A. Bakos and J. F. Heard in 1958, who found a magnitude of 7.72 for the primary eclipse minimum and 7.30 for the secondary. They refined the class estimates, finding the primary is probably a K1IV subgiant in close orbit with an F8V main sequence star. In 1972, H. L. Atkins and D. S. Hall included it on a list of RS Canum Venaticorum type variable systems and showed it has an infrared excess.

S. Jakate and associates in 1976 found that the period of luminosity variation is changing over time. They discovered strong emission in the H and K lines of the K star and noted that it showed intrinsic variability. The system displayed unusual episodes of emission and variation in the Hα line, which was interpreted by astronomers as ejected material possibly forming a transient disk.

Significant star spot activity was found all over the K-type star, with variations in the total spot coverage observed over time. It is estimated to be filling 85% of its Roche lobe due to the gravitational influence of the secondary. The rotation period of this star is several times slower than its orbital period, while the rotation of the F-type star is synchronous. Changes in radial velocity of the system over time suggest it is a triple star system, with the tertiary component having ~90% of the mass of the Sun and an orbital period of 1,283 days.

References

Further reading

 As '35.1934 Piscium'.

K-type subgiants
F-type main-sequence stars
RS Canum Venaticorum variables
Triple stars
Eclipsing binaries

Pisces (constellation)
Durchmusterung objects
219113
114639
Piscium, SZ